{{DISPLAYTITLE:L4Linux}}

L4Linux is a variant of the Linux kernel for operating systems, that is altered to the extent that it can run paravirtualized on an L4 microkernel, where the L4Linux kernel runs a service. L4Linux is not a fork but a variant and is binary compatible with the Linux x86 kernel, thus it can replace the Linux kernel of any Linux distribution.

L4Linux is being developed by the Dresden Real-Time Operating System Project (DROPS) to allow real-time and time-sharing programs to run on a computer in parallel at the same time.

L4Linux also allows setting up a virtualized environment vaguely similar to Xen or Kernel-based Virtual Machine (KVM), but a few significant differences exist between the intent of Xen and L4Linux.

L4Android 
L4Android is a fork of L4Linux which encompasses the modifications to the main-line Linux kernel for Android. It is a joint project of the operating systems group of the Dresden University of Technology and the chair for Security in Telecommunications of the Berlin Institute of Technology.

See also
Wombat (operating system)
MkLinux, a similar port of the Linux kernel, but to a Mach microkernel

References

Linux kernel variant
Virtualization software for Linux